Pyari Devi Agrahari was Indian politician and wife of freedom fighter Gauriram Gupta. She was elected as MLA for Pharenda in 1969 Uttar Pradesh assembly election. She was member of Uttar Pradesh Vidhan Sabha from 1969 to 1974. Pyari Devi was first women legislator of Gorakhpur (now Maharajganj) district.

See also 
 Uttar Pradesh Vidhan Sabha

References

Indian independence activists
Uttar Pradesh politicians
Indian National Congress politicians
Year of birth missing
Indian National Congress politicians from Uttar Pradesh